Wanda Warenine is a 1917 Italian silent film directed by Riccardo Tolentino and starring Joaquín Carrasco, Fabienne Fabrèges and Bonaventura Ibáñez. It is based on a story by Alexander Pushkin.

Cast
 Joaquín Carrasco 
 Fabienne Fabrèges as Wanda Warenine 
 Bonaventura Ibáñez   
 Domenico Serra

References

Bibliography
 Goble, Alan. The Complete Index to Literary Sources in Film. Walter de Gruyter, 1999.

External links

1917 films
1917 drama films
Italian silent feature films
Italian drama films
1910s Italian-language films
Italian black-and-white films
Silent drama films